Miller Lake is a lake in Carver County, Minnesota, in the United States.

Miller Lake was named for Herman Mueller, an early settler.

See also
List of lakes in Minnesota

References

Lakes of Minnesota
Lakes of Carver County, Minnesota